Elena Russo (born February 13, 1972) is an Italian actress of cinema, television and theatre.

Career
Elena Russo was born in Naples, Campania, but she moved to Rome, where she started his career as an actress. Her debut was on the film Finalmente soli (1997), directed by Umberto Marino, following by Besame mucho (1999), by Maurizio Ponzi, and Amor nello specchio (1999), by Salvatore Maira.

In 2002, she is the protagonist of the film N'gopp - Lasciatemi sognare. In 2003 she has an important role in Tutto in quella notte, directed by Franco Bertini, and she is the protagonist of the short Non può piovere sempre, directed by Alfio D'Agata. In 2006 she starred, along with Neri Marcorè and Vincenzo Salemme, in Baciami piccola, directed by Roberto Cimpanelli.

She also worked in a lot of television series or television film, like Orgoglio (as Clara Dani), Amiche mie, L'onore e il rispetto (as Assunta Rocca), Sangue caldo (as Concetta "Ciacià" Lorusso), Rodolfo Valentino - La leggenda (as Rosa Cuccurullo), Furore - Il vento della speranza (as Sofia Fiore) and La luna e il lago.

Filmography

Film
 Finalmente soli (1997)
 Besame mucho (1999)
 Amor nello specchio (1999)
 L'uomo della fortuna (2000)
 La vita è un gioco (2000)
 E adesso sesso (2001)
 N'gopp - Lasciatemi sognare (2002)
 Tutto in quella notte (2003)
 Baciami piccina (2006)
 Io non ci casco (2008)
 Baarìa (2009)
 Ce n'è per tutti (2009)
 Sharm el Sheikh - Un'estate indimenticabile (2010)
 Buona giornata (2013)

Television
 Il maresciallo Rocca (1998)
 Il delitto nel cortile (1999)
 Storia di guerra e d'amicizia (2002)
 Ma il portiere non c'è mai? (2002)
 Don Matteo (2002)
 Vento di ponente (2003–2004)
 Orgoglio (2004–2006)
 Grandi domani (2005)
 L'uomo sbagliato (2005)
 Elisa di Rivombrosa (2005)
 La luna e il lago (2006)
 Io non dimentico (2008)
 Amiche mie (2008)
 L'onore e il rispetto (2009)
 Sangue caldo (2011)
 I cerchi nell'acqua (2011)
 Rodolfo Valentino - La leggenda (2014)
 Furore - Il vento della speranza (2014–?)

Theatre
 Il Topo Nel Cortile (2013)

References

External links

1972 births
Living people
Italian television actresses
Italian film actresses